Jeffrey Davidson Bostic popularly known as "The Colonel" (born 27 October 1960) is a Barbadian politician and soldier. He was a cabinet minister in the cabinet of Mia Mottley. Bostic was the Minister of Health and Wellness of Barbados and a Member of the House of Assembly of Barbados.

Early life and career 
Jeffrey Davidson Bostic was born on 27 October 1960. He attended St. Mary’s Infants and Junior School and Combermere. He then studied at the University of the West Indies where he secured a Bachelor of Arts degree from the university. He also holds a post graduate diploma from the Inter-American Defence College in the field of Hemispheric Security.

Military career 
Bostic has served on several positions in the Barbados Defence Force, in 1989 during his time in the military, Bostic served as equerry to Queen Elizabeth II during her last visit to Barbados and also worked with Governor General Sir Hugh Springer as an aide de camp. In 2006, he had retired as a Commanding Officer of the Barbados Regiment and Director of Operations at the RSS from the Barbados Defence Force after serving over 20years in the army.

Political career 

Jeffrey was first elected to the Barbados House of Assembly in 2013, after successfully securing the majority vote in the 2013 general elections of Barbados. He was elected on 21 February 2013. After his first term he was re-elected in 2018 as member of parliament. Bostic retained his seat in the 24 May 2018 election and was subsequently appointed Minister of Health.

He retired on January 18, 2022 as Minister of Health of Barbados after serving almost four decades.

References 

1960 births
Living people
Barbados Labour Party politicians
Members of the House of Assembly of Barbados
Health ministers of Barbados
University of the West Indies alumni